Queen Muhammad Ali (Queen Melé Le'iato Tuiasosopo Muhammad Ali) is an American Samoan film director, photographer, graphic design artist, activist, and writer. Ali is the founder of Nation19 magazine, and the director of the Manuia Samoa, a social wellness hub in American Samoa.

Queen was one of the organizers of the Indigenous Peoples March, held in January 2019.

Early life 
Queen was born in Watts, Los Angeles, the daughter of an American Samoan mother who worked as a teacher, and an African American father who toured the Caribbean working as a percussionist and singer. Graduating high school at an early age, Queen attended Mt. San Jacinto College, where she studied art. Queen's grandmother, Princess Masaniai Tunufa'i Le'iato Tuiasosopo, is the daughter of Paramount Chief Tuli Le'iato of American Samoa.

Career

Early career 
From 1999 to 2007, while attending college, Queen worked as an elementary grade school teacher for a private school. She also composed music for network television in 2007.

2009-present 
Queen made her debut as a TV producer in 2009, when she worked on T.I.'s Road to Redemption starring American rapper and actor T.I. In the winter of 2010, Queen and long time partner Hakeem Khaaliq established Nation19 which doubles as an artist collective and printed magazine that produces documentary films, and exhibits. In 2016, her short film #Bars4Justice was an official selection at the 24th Annual Pan African Film Festival in Los Angeles and she was the only woman selected to speak at the United Nations Global Peace dialogue in NYC on December 15, 2020.

Works

Film and television
Comin' Up Short (Director)
#War on Us (Director)  
 #Bars4Justice (Director)
 The Last Matai 
 ¿Quiénes son los afro-mexicanos? - Univision International Television
 T.I.'s Road To Redemption - MTV
 Adventures in Hollyhood - MTV

Educational exhibits and installations 
 Invisible México : Afro-Mexicanos Arizona Community Foundation (The Karen Work Seleznow Gallery)
Invisible Mexico: Global Education Center Nashville, Tennessee September 2017
 A New New Wave! monOrchid Gallery Phoenix Arizona
 Invisible Mexico: monOrchid Gallery Phoenix Arizona March 2017
 Exhibit19: February 2015 Glendale Community College 
 Invisible Mexico: Private Gallery Univision Television April - July 2014 
 #TURNUP Denver: DVSN WEST Cherry Creek Denver CO 2014

Design and multimedia
Michael Jackson commissioned Queen and her partner Hakeem Khaaliq to design for his "This Is It" London tour. The work included the design of The Earth Song website, design of MichaelJacksonCO.com website, print campaigns and the design of The Earth Song Logo.

References

American film directors
Living people
Year of birth missing (living people)
African-American film directors
American women film directors
American people of Samoan descent
Samoan film directors
21st-century African-American people
21st-century African-American women